ASCII Express is a telecommunications program, written for the Apple II series of computers. At a time when the use of the bulletin board system (BBS), or even telecommunications in general was not a common use of the Apple II, ASCII Express (from hereon as its more common name "AE") was the choice among telecommunication users throughout much of the 1980s.

ASCII Express II 

The original version of AE, called ASCII Express II, was written by Bill Blue in 1980, and distributed by Southwestern Data Systems. AE II runs on any Apple II with DOS 3.x and one of a small handful of modems available, including the Hayes Micromodem II. This version was used mostly by telecommunicators to access paid BBSs, including THE SOURCE, CompuServe, as well as free BBSs. The interface of AE II is basically menu-driven, with virtually none of the features included that is expected of a telecomm program today, such as terminal emulation and multi-file transfer protocols like YMODEM and ZMODEM.

ASCII Express The Professional 

By 1982, ASCII Express II ceased development, and was replaced by a totally re-written replacement called ASCII Express "The Professional", also known as "ASCII Express Professional" or its much shorter name "AE Pro". This version was a collaboration between Bill Blue and Mark Robbins.  AE Pro was a command-line driven telecomm program packed with many features lacking in its predecessor, including scripting, YMODEM and ZMODEM, terminal emulation, and support for Apple ProDOS 8. AE Pro can also be used as a pseudo-BBS when configured as a host, allowing a user to dial-in and exchange files. This type of system was coined the name AE line.

Earlier versions of AE Pro were distributed by Roger Wagner of Southwestern Data Systems, and later by United Software Industries (founded by Mark Robbins, Bill Blue and others). Greg Schaefer converted AE Pro from Apple DOS 3.3 to Apple ProDOS in an afternoon, and received US$5000 for his efforts.

In 1984 Bill Blue and Joe Holt ported AE Pro to MS-DOS and 8086 assembly language. In 1985 Joe Holt and Greg Schaefer rewrote AE Pro for the Apple II taking advantage of the platform's new mouse and MouseText features. It also featured advanced scripting and a full-featured mouse-based text editor. This product was released as MouseTalk. AE Pro and MouseTalk were soon overshadowed by ProTERM, a telecom product that utilizes many of the advanced features of the Apple IIe and IIc, such as 65C02 opcodes, use of the mouse, and macros.

Peer to peer file sharing 

The early 1980s was the period when modeming was becoming very active throughout the world. Hundreds of Apple II-based BBSs popped up, most of them used only as message boards. With the aid of free Apple II hacking software like Dalton's Disk Disintegrator (DDD), computer users were able to take an un-protected floppy disk, compress it into multiple files, then transmit those files to another user. This was actually one of several origins of what is known today as peer-to-peer file transfers.

While other Apple II-based telecom programs, such as DiskFur and CatFur, allowed for complete disk and file transfers, there was a need for a portal concept - one that is hosted using a BBS as its entry point. This way, a community including software enthusiasts and those who trade in unlicensed software could collaborate as well as exchange software.

AE Pro was at the time the only telecom program that was accessible, via an undocumented hack, from virtually any other BBS software, such as GBBS, Networks II, among other programs. This allowed for sysops to control access to the AE lines via user accounts. With many of the users phreaking their way into AE lines, these portals allowed for international warez communities to develop. 

AE knock-offs were also developed, including PAE (Pseudo Ascii Express--"Written by a Pirate for Pirates") and PAE ProDOS, both written as free add-ons to GBBS. Unlike AE, the source code was freely available for these add-ons.  A popular MS DOS-based BBS Celerity BBS from the 1990's had a "CAE" (Celerity Ascii Express) mode which dropped a caller into a no-user-record file transfer system.

Reception
II Computing listed ASCII Express Professional tenth on the magazine's list of top Apple II non-game, non-educational software as of late 1985, based on sales and market-share data.

References

External links 
Subculture of the Subculture, describing the on-line copyright infringement phenomenon of the 1980s.
The Do's and Don'ts of ASCII Express, an example document written in 1985, lecturing newbies how to use AE lines.
Historical BBS List, many of them being AE lines.
PAE ProDOS, GBBS and PAE ProDOS source files from Shooting Star BBS.

Apple II software